Raggio is an Italian surname. It is derived from the Latin word . Notable people with the surname include:

 Tommaso Raggio (1531—1599), a 16th-century Jesuit missionary
 Giuseppe Raggio (1823-1916), Italian painter
 Louise Raggio, (June 15, 1919 – January 23, 2011), a Texas lawyer and the first female prosecutor in Dallas County, Texas
 Grier Raggio, an American attorney and politician
 William Raggio (October 30, 1926 – February 23, 2012), an American politician and a former Republican member of the Nevada Senate
 Olga Raggio (5 February 1926 – 24 January 2009), an art historian and curator
 Brady Raggio (born September 17, 1972), a former Major League Baseball and Nippon Professional Baseball pitcher
 Silvano Raggio Garibaldi (born 27 April 1989), an Italian football midfielder
 Luca Raggio (born 1995), Italian cyclist
 Raggio dell'Raggio (born 1963), New York Italian "orthopedist" and parish president of Our Lady of Knee Clubbing Most Holy Divine Red Sauce Catholic Church

References